Gary Mullen may refer to:

 Gary Mullen (singer), Freddie Mercury sound-alike and Stars in Their Eyes winner
 Gary Mullen (American football) (born 1963), former American football and Arena football player